Ekaterina Illarionovna Mikhailova-Demina (22 December 1925 – 24 June 2019) was a Russian military doctor who was the only woman to have served in front-line reconnaissance in the Soviet marines during World War II.

She carried hundreds of men off the battlefield and was seriously wounded three times during her career as a medic with the marines. Despite repeatedly being nominated she was denied high honors at the war's end, reflecting the Soviet Union's unequal approach to honoring its fighting men and women. However, she was belatedly honored by President Mikhail Gorbachev in May 1990 with the title of Hero of the Soviet Union.

Wartime career
Born in Leningrad, Mikhailova-Demina lost her parents at an early age and grew up in a Leningrad orphanage.

She was aged just fifteen at the outbreak of the Great Patriotic War in June 1941 but promptly volunteered for military service in Smolensk after a train she was travelling on was bombed en route to Brest. Adding two years to her age, she was rejected by the recruitment office but was accepted by a military hospital.

The patients of the hospital soon had to be evacuated after the building was bombed but Mikhailova-Demina stayed behind, as Germans advanced towards Moscow through the summer of 1941, to work as a field medic for the Red Army (which was desperately short of medical personnel). When she suffered a serious injury to her leg in fighting near Gzhatsk she was sent to the Urals to recuperate.

On returning to duty she was posted to the Red Moscow, a hospital ship of the Soviet Navy that was employed in transporting wounded soldiers from Stalingrad to Krasnoyarsk. She was promoted to chief petty officer and commended for exemplary service.

However, she became bored by the work and volunteered for front-line service with the Azov Flotilla of the Soviet marine infantry. Although her request was initially denied, she appealed to the government in Moscow and was accepted for service in the 369th Independent Naval Infantry Battalion in February 1943. She first saw action with the marines on the Taman Peninsula on the Azov Sea before moving on to battles elsewhere along the Black Sea littoral and on the Dniester. After her unit was transferred to the Danube Flotilla she fought her way through Romania, Bulgaria, Hungary, Yugoslavia and Austria, and ended the war in Vienna.

She was not welcomed at first by the men in her unit. However, she was soon accepted after she proved that she could handle herself well in the front line. As well as scouting enemy territory alongside her male colleagues, her work involved treating the wounded and evacuating them to safety. She won her first medal for valour for participating in the recapture of Temryuk on the Taman Peninsula and was awarded the first of two Orders of the Patriotic War for taking part in the Battle of Kerch.

In August 1944 Mikhailova-Demina participated in a commando-style operation to recapture the city of Bilhorod-Dnistrovskyi in Ukraine. Her unit crossed the Dniester estuary in rubber boats and climbed an enemy-held ridge. Mikhailova-Demina was in the first group to climb the ridge and joined in the charge to expel the enemy from the ridge. She single-handedly assaulted a fortified German position, blew up their bunker, killed 20 Nazis, taking 14 prisoners, and treated 17 wounded sailors and helped them get to safety. She earned an Order of the Red Banner for her role in the assault.

Four months later, in December 1944, her unit had advanced to Yugoslavia. During an attack on the fortress of Ilok in Croatia, she was one of 50 marines who carried out a diversionary attack from a small island in the Danube below the fortress. The unit had to use trees as firing positions as the island was flooded. In the firefight that followed, Mikhailova-Demina was shot through the hand. Only 13 of her unit survived the intense gun battle and all were wounded. Some of the casualties fell out of their trees and into the freezing water but were saved by Mikhailova-Demina, who jumped in and used belts and rifle slings to tie the wounded men to the trees. Seven men were saved by her. The battle left her with double pneumonia in addition to the wound to her hand and required her to be hospitalized. Despite this, she left the hospital early without authorization and returned to her unit. She was awarded a second Order of the Red Banner for her heroism.

Post-war career and recognition
Mikhailova-Demina was demobilised in November 1945 but continued to work in the medical profession after the war, including stints with the Soviet Red Cross and Red Crescent Society. She was awarded the Florence Nightingale Medal by the International Committee of the Red Cross for her work during the war. In 1950 she graduated from the Second Leningrad Medical Institute and worked as a doctor for 36 years, retiring in 1985.

She was nominated three times for the Hero of the Soviet Union, the country's highest distinction, but was turned down on each occasion. She finally received the medal along with the Order of Lenin and Gold Star by a decree issued by President Gorbachev on 5 May 1990 to mark the 45th anniversary of the end of the war. Mikhailova-Demina was one of the last honored before the fall of the Soviet Union in 1991.

After the death of Yevdokiya Pasko in January 2017, Demina remained the last living female Hero of the Soviet Union that was a veteran of the Second World War, with the other two being cosmonauts Valentina Tereshkova and Svetlana Savitskaya.

Yekaterina Illarionovna Mikhailova-Demina died in June 2019 at the age of 93 and was buried in the Troyekurovskoye Cemetery (plot 26).

Awards and honors
Florence Nightingale Medal (15 May 1979)
Hero of the Soviet Union (5 May 1990)
Order of Lenin (5 May 1990)
Two Orders of the Red Banner (27 September 1944 and 8 March 1945)
Order of the Patriotic War 1st class and 2nd class (1st class - 11 March 1985; 2nd class - 15 February 1944)
Medal "For Courage" (31 October 1943)
Medal "For the Capture of Vienna"
Medal "For the Capture of Königsberg"
Medal "For the Capture of Budapest"
various jubilee medals

See also

 List of female Heroes of the Soviet Union

References

Bibliography
 

1925 births
2019 deaths
Burials in Troyekurovskoye Cemetery
Florence Nightingale Medal recipients
Heroes of the Soviet Union
Recipients of the Medal "For Courage" (Russia)
Recipients of the Order of the Red Banner
Soviet military doctors
Soviet military personnel of World War II
Soviet Navy personnel
Soviet women in World War II
Women in the Russian and Soviet military